is a men's volleyball team based in Hiroshima city, Hiroshima, Japan. It plays in V.Premier League. The owner of the club is Japan Tobacco.

History
The club was founded in 1931 as a club of the Ministry of Finance Japan Hiroshima Monopoly Bureau.

In 1985, the team was renamed as Japan Tabaco and changed into JT as in 1989. In 2019, team name changed into JT Thunders Hiroshima.

Current Roster
The following is team roster of Season 2022-2023
{|class="wikitable sortable" style="font-size:100%; text-align:center;"
! colspan="6"| Team roster – Season 2022-2023|-
!style="width:4em; color:#00B16B; background-color:#FFEF00"|No.
!style="width:10em; color:#00B16B; background-color:#FFEF00"|Name
!style="width:14em; color:#00B16B; background-color:#FFEF00"|Date of birth
!style="width:8em; color:#00B16B; background-color:#FFEF00"|Height
!style="width:8em; color:#00B16B; background-color:#FFEF00"|Position
|-
| ||style="text-align:left;"|Takuya Yasunaga ||style="text-align:right;"| || ||Middle Blocker
|-
||| style="text-align:left;"| Taishi Onodera (c)|| style="text-align:right;" |||||Middle Blocker
|-
||| style="text-align:left;"| Makoto Nishimura|| style="text-align:right;" |||||Outside Hitter
|-
||| style="text-align:left;"| Kenta Nakajima|| style="text-align:right;" |||||Middle Blocker
|-
||| style="text-align:left;"| Shinichiro Inoue|| style="text-align:right;" |||||Outside Hitter
|-
||| style="text-align:left;"|  Aaron Russell|| style="text-align:right;" |||||Outside Hitter
|-
||| style="text-align:left;"| Yudai Arai|| style="text-align:right;" |||||Outside Hitter
|-
|||| style="text-align:left;"| Koshi Takechi|| style="text-align:right;" |||||Outside Hitter
|-
|||| style="text-align:left;"| Kaisei Hirai|| style="text-align:right;" |||||Middle Blocker
|-
||| style="text-align:left;"| Wataru Inoue|| style="text-align:right;" |||||Lebero
|-
|11|| style="text-align:left;" |Junya Sakashita|| style="text-align:right;" |||||Outside Hitter
|-
|12|| style="text-align:left;" |Shinpei Goda|| style="text-align:right;" ||| ||Setter
|-
|14 ||style="text-align:left;"|Ataru Kumakura ||style="text-align:right;"||| ||Outside Hitter
|-
|15 ||style="text-align:left;"|Taishi Karakawa ||style="text-align:right;"||| ||Lebero
|-
|16 ||style="text-align:left;"|Chihiro Nishi ||style="text-align:right;"||| ||Middle Blocker
|-
|17 ||style="text-align:left;"|Masaki Kaneko ||style="text-align:right;"||| ||Setter
|-
|18 ||style="text-align:left;"|Shohei Yamamoto ||style="text-align:right;"||| ||Outside Hitter
|-
|19 ||style="text-align:left;"| Jiang Chuan ||style="text-align:right;"||| ||Opposite Hitter
|-
|20 ||style="text-align:left;"|Daiki Abe ||style="text-align:right;"||| ||Setter
|-
|colspan=5 |Head coach:  Raúl Lozano
|}

Honours
Japan Volleyball League/V.League/V.Premier League
Champion (×1): 2014–15 
Runners-up (×8): 1973, 1978, 1996–97, 2000–01, 2002–03, 2003–04, 2013–14 and 2018–19
Kurowashiki All Japan Volleyball Tournament
Champions (×2): 2001 and 2004
Runners-up (×5): 1969, 1977, 1978, 2010 and 2014
Emperor's Cup
Champion (×3): 2007, 2015, 2018
Runner-up (×1): 2009

League results
 Champion'''    Runner-up

Notable foreign players 
  Igor Shulepov 1999-2000
  Ilya Savelev 2001-2004
  Gabriel Gardner 2005-2006
  Maxim Panteleymonenko 2007-2008
  Ernardo Gómez 2008-2012
  Igor Omrcen 2012-2014
  Leandro Vissotto 2014-2015
  Dražen Luburić 2016-2017
  Thomas Edgar 2017–2022
  Liu Libin 2018-2019
  Chen Chien-Chen 2019–2022

References

External links
JTI Official Website (ja)

Japanese volleyball teams
Volleyball clubs established in 1931
Sports teams in Hiroshima
Japan Tobacco